Kamenná is a municipality and village in Třebíč District in the Vysočina Region of the Czech Republic. It has about 200 inhabitants.

Administrative parts
The village of Klementice is an administrative part of Kamenná.

References

Villages in Třebíč District